Toronto and Region Islamic Congregation, commonly referred to by its acronym as TARIC Islamic Center is one of the largest Islamic Centers in the city of Toronto, Ontario, Canada, formerly in the city of North York. With its distinct box-shaped oriental motif, TARIC makes a rather unusual and highly visible landmark in the city of Toronto, primarily due to its location on a vacant space near the very busy multi-level Hwy 401/Hwy 400 interchange.

History and organization
However, it was to take well over a decade to accumulate the necessary additional funds for the construction of a building. The current building structure was completed and opened to public in 1991, and is in fact only the first of a two-phase complex of a much larger building. The TARIC building houses a library, a gymnasium and the main prayer hall. With a full-time imam, weekend classes on Arabic and the basics of the Islamic religion are taught, as well as dawah programs and dialogue with local community and neighbourhood organizations.

TARIC's goal is to bring the simple, honest message of Islam to Muslims and non-Muslims alike. This means stressing the importance of the five pillars of Islam encouraging Muslims to read the Qur'an, and to constantly practice zikkir (the remembrance of Allah).

Activities
The issue of Gulf Weekly of 25–31 May 1995 said "..The TARIC Islamic Centre, probably the most vibrant and effective in reaching out to non-Muslims is, perhaps the premier Muslim outfit in Metropolitan Toronto."

A large number of programmes are carried out at the Centre. Some of these include, Adult Tarbiya class on Sundays, Arabic language classes, A marriage introduction service, Marriage and family counseling, Conducting marriages and funerals, An Islamic bookstore, Interfaith dialogue, Dawa programmes for non Muslims, Mosque visits, Political and social awareness programmes, Seminars on Islamic and secular subjects, Family nights, Summer camps, Weekly youth activities, and other Women’s programmes as well.

At one time, TARIC had also established a full-time Islamic school from Junior Kindergarten to Grade 8 in a building leased from the Toronto District School Board. This was however discontinued in 2003.

See also

List of mosques in Canada
  List of mosques in the Americas
  Lists of mosques

References

External links

 Toronto and Region Islamic Congregation
 Listing on Torontomuslims.com

Mosques in Toronto
Organizations based in Toronto
Islamic organizations based in Canada